Let There Be Light is a 2017 American Christian drama directed by and starring Kevin Sorbo and written by Dan Gordon and Sam Sorbo. Music by Marc Vanocur. The plot follows an atheist who goes through a near-death experience in an auto accident and converts to Christianity. Sean Hannity executive produced and appears in the film.  Dionne Warwick and Travis Tritt also have roles in the film. It was released in the United States on October 27, 2017.

Plot summary
Outspoken atheist Dr. Sol Harkens is having a debate with a Christian leader. After Harkens is considered to have won the debate, he attends a party for his book. He double-fists cocktails while trying to get his girlfriend to come home with him that night; she refuses. Disappointed, Harkens heads home in a drunken haze to sleep it off. On the way home, his publicist calls him to arrange more parties to increase his exposure. Since he was already drunk after leaving his party and continues to drink on the way home, he veers off the road and crashes into a construction site.

Suddenly surrounded by a carnival-like light tunnel, he sees hallucinations of his young son David, who died a few years earlier from cancer. His son enthusiastically claims that he is all right and that Sol should let God's love fill him, proclaiming "Let there be light!" as Dr. Harkens comes out of unconsciousness. After being clinically dead for 4 minutes, he awakens to find his Christian ex-wife Katy at his side, and tells her that he saw their son. His doctor diagnoses his visions as merely adrenal brain surges that are caused by traumatic moments.

Harkens continues to struggle with his crisis of science versus faith. After Katy shows up at his house to check on him, he decides to go and talk to pastor and former mob member Vinny at a church. After hearing the resurrection story, he has an epiphany and is baptized again as a believing Christian. After several visits from his ex-wife, he decides to rekindle their relationship so they can be a family again with their two surviving sons. He proposes and she accepts, but almost immediately they learn that she has cancer and is past the point of treatment.

Fox News' Sean Hannity hears of Dr. Harkens' story and asks him to come onto his program because he considers his story of great merit. Harkens announces a campaign of world peace called the "Let There Be Light" campaign. He believes that if everyone in the world shines their lights to the sky at night that it could be a bolster to world unity. During the night of the event the simultaneous action of the world shining their light to the heavens is visible from space. Meanwhile back home, the newly-remarried Harkens are having a night of family time singing Christmas songs outside when Katy suddenly dies in Sol's arms.

Production
The film was mostly shot in Birmingham, Alabama, with minor additional scenes filmed in New York City.

Cast 
 Kevin Sorbo as Dr. Sol Harkens
 Sam Sorbo as Katy Harkens
 Braeden Sorbo as Gus Harkens
 Shane Sorbo as Connor Harkems
 Daniel Roebuck as Norm
 Donielle Artese as Tracee
 Gary Grubbs as Dr. Fornier
 Travis Tritt as Dr. Corey
 Joe Herrera as Dr. Shell
 Leander Suleiman as Dr. Patel
 Walnette Marie Santiago as Cat Ryerson
 Olivia Fox as Vanessa
 Dionne Warwick as herself
 Mona Amein as Sally
 Sherri Eakin as Waitress
 Michael Franzese as Pastor Vinny
 Sean Hannity as himself

Release 
The film was released in the United States on October 27, 2017. Over its opening weekend the film made $1.9 million from 373 theaters (a per-theater average of $5,071), finishing 11th at the box office. In its second weekend the film was added to 269 theaters and dropped just 1.9% to $1.7 million, finishing 10th at the box office.

Critical response

On review aggregator website Rotten Tomatoes, the film has an approval rating of 30% based on 10 reviews, with an average rating of 4/10. Some reviewers question the accuracy of the film's claims and claim the characters in the film are strawmen. Dan Piepenbring, writing for the New Yorker, described the film as "a cynical, xenophobic morality tale, as bitter as it is saccharine." Conversely, the film has also been cited as a "warm redemption tale" that is "above-average for the [Christian film] genre".

References

External links 
 
 

2017 films
American drama films
Films about Christianity
Sean Hannity
2017 drama films
Films with atheism-related themes
2010s English-language films
2010s American films